Floodplain restoration is the process of fully or partially restoring a river's floodplain to its original conditions before having been affected by the construction of levees (dikes) and the draining of wetlands and marshes. 

The objectives of restoring floodplains include the reduction of the incidence of floods, the provision of habitats for aquatic species, the improvement of water quality and the increased recharge of groundwater.

Description

Europe 
In Europe, very few schemes for restoring functional floodplains have been put in practice so far, despite a surge of interest in the topic among policy and research circles. One of the drivers for floodplain restoration is the EU Water Framework Directive. Early floodplain restoration schemes were undertaken in the mid-1990s in the Rheinvorland-Süd on the Upper Rhine, the Bourret on the Garonne, and as part of the Long Eau project in England. Ongoing schemes in 2007 include Lenzen on the Elbe, La Basse on the Seine and the Parrett Catchment Project in England. On the Elbe River near Lenzen (Brandenburg), 420 hectares of floodplain were restored in order to prevent a recurrence of the Elbe floods of 2002. A total of 20 floodplain restoration projects on the Elbe River were envisaged after the 2002 floods, but only two have been implemented as of 2009 according to the environmental group :de:BUND.

United States 
In the United States, examples of floodplain restoration can be found in the catchment area of the Chesapeake Bay in Maryland, in the Emiquon Preserve on the Illinois River, in Charlotte, North Carolina  and along the Baraboo River in Wisconsin.

See also
Ecological restoration
Riparian zone restoration
Stream restoration

References

Ecological restoration
Flood control
Stormwater management
Water and the environment
Water resources management
Floodplains